Good Night or Goodnight may refer to:

Film and television
 Good Night (film), a 2008 short film from India
 The Good Night, a 2007 film
 Good Night, and Good Luck, a 2005 film
 Good Night, one of five mini-episodes from the Doctor Who shorts "Night and the Doctor"
 "Good Night" (Homeland), 10th episode of season 3 of the TV series Homeland
 "Good Night" (The Simpsons short), a short from The Tracy Ullman Show featuring the debut of the main Simpsons family

Music

Albums
 Goodnight, by William Fitzsimmons

Songs
"Goodnight" (Babybird song), 1996
 "Good Night" (Beatles song), 1968
 "Good Night" (Reece Mastin song), 2011
 "A Good Night" (John Legend song), 2018
 "Goodnight", by Air Supply from Across the Concrete Sky
 "Goodnight", by Cher Lloyd from Sorry I'm Late
 "Goodnight", by Cliff Eberhardt, covered by,
 Buffy Sainte-Marie from Coincidence and Likely Stories
 Erasure from Other People's Songs
 "Goodnight", by Galactic from Coolin' Off
 "Goodnight", by Idlewild from Warnings/Promises
 "Good Night", by Kanye West from Graduation
 "Good Night", by Masaharu Fukuyama
 "Good Night", by The Pillows from White Incarnation
 "Good Night", by Toby Fox, a track from the soundtrack of the 2015 video game Undertale
 "Goodnight", by ZOX from Line in the Sand
 "Goodnight", a 1965 single by Roy Orbison

People
Goodnight (surname), including a list of people named Goodnight

Places

In Australia 

 Good Night, Queensland, a locality in the Bundaberg Region

In the United States 
 Goodnight, Kentucky, an unincorporated community
 Goodnight, Missouri, a village
 Goodnight, Oklahoma, an unincorporated community
 Goodnight, Texas, an unincorporated community

See also
 Goodnight Goodnight (disambiguation)